Following is a list of senators of French citizens living abroad, who have represented French residents of foreign countries in the Senate of France since World War II (1939–45).

Fourth Republic

During the French Fourth Republic the 27 October 1946 constitution defined a "Council of the Republic", the name used for the Senate until 1958.
Three seats were reserved for "Councilors of the Republic" (senators) representing  Français de l’extérieur (French from outside)  living in Europe, the Americas and Asia-Oceania. 
Special provisions applied to Africa, in which the colonies and protectorates also had elected representatives.
Elections were indirect, through an electoral college composed of representatives of expatriate organizations.
Senators of French citizens living abroad during the French Fourth Republic were:

Fifth Republic

During the French Fifth Republic the 28 September 1958 constitution and subsequent ordinances increased the number of senators to six, with two representing Europe and the Americas, one for Asia-Oceania, and three for Africa.
Africa was over-represented compared to Europe and America in this arrangement.
The 84-member Conseil supérieur des Français de l'étranger (CSFE) served as the electoral college.
The first major reform of the CSFE was with the law of 7 June 1982, under which voting members of the CSFE would be directly elected, and these members would in turn elect 12 senators for nine-year terms. 
The seats were divided into series A, B and C, with elections for one of the series held every three years.

1959–2004: 9-year terms

Senators of French citizens living abroad (Français Établis Hors De France) during the French Fifth Republic were:

2004–2010: transition from 9- to 6-year terms

In July 2003 the term was reduced to six years and the series changed to Series 1 and 2, with a transitional period until 2010.
Senators of French citizens living abroad (Français Établis Hors De France) elected during the transition were:

2010–present: 6-year terms

Senators of French citizens living abroad (Français Établis Hors De France) elected after the transition were:

References

Sources

 
Lists of members of the Senate (France) by department